Megalomphalus petitianus is a species of very small sea snail, a marine gastropod mollusk in the family Vanikoridae.

Description

Distribution

References

 Warén A. & Bouchet P. (1988) A new species of Vanikoridae from the western Mediterranean, with remarks on the Northeast Atlantic species of the family. Bollettino Malacologico 24(5-8): 73-100.
 Gofas, S.; Le Renard, J.; Bouchet, P. (2001). Mollusca, in: Costello, M.J. et al. (Ed.) (2001). European register of marine species: a check-list of the marine species in Europe and a bibliography of guides to their identification. Collection Patrimoines Naturels, 50: pp. 180–213

Vanikoridae
Gastropods described in 1869